Les Collines-de-l'Outaouais (French for "The hills of the Outaouais") is a regional county municipality in the Outaouais region of western Quebec, Canada. The region nearly encircles the City of Gatineau, which is to the south. Its administrative seat is in Chelsea, Quebec.

It was created in January 1991 when the Communauté régionale de l'Outaouais (Outaouais Regional Community) was split into Les Collines-de-l'Outaouais RCM and the Communauté urbaine de l'Outaouais (Outaouais Urban Community, now City of Gatineau). The region is home to the majority of Gatineau Park. It is bisected by the Gatineau River which flows from north to south. The Ottawa River forms the southwestern boundary.

Subdivisions
There are six subdivisions within the RCM:

Municipalities (6)
 Cantley
 Chelsea
 L'Ange-Gardien
 La Pêche
 Pontiac
 Val-des-Monts

Demographics

Transportation

Access routes
Highways and numbered routes that run through the municipality, including external routes that start or finish at the county border:

 Autoroutes
 
 

 Principal highways
 

 Secondary highways
 
 
 
 

 External routes
 None

See also
 List of regional county municipalities and equivalent territories in Quebec

References

External links

 MRC Les Collines-de-l'Outaouais
 Statistics Canada

Regional county municipalities in Outaouais
Census divisions of Quebec